The Rolex Monterey Motorsports Reunion is an annual event held at WeatherTech Raceway Laguna Seca in Monterey, California. Its purpose is to provide an event in which historic racecars can compete. It takes place over the course of one weekend every mid-August. It was first established by Steve Earle in 1974 as the Monterey Historic Automobile Races. Earle organized the meeting for his friends to race their cars at Laguna Seca. The event acts as a part of Monterey Car Week, which includes the Pebble Beach Concours d'Elegance and other events.

Approximately 550 cars participate in the event.

Due to the COVID-19 pandemic, the 2020 event was canceled.

Sponsorship

The first company to sponsor the event was the Chrysler Corporation. Later, the event added a sponsorship from Rolex. The Chrysler sponsorship was replaced with one from Toyota, who sponsored the event from 2006 to 2008.

Awards
Although celebrities and professional drivers do attend, the Reunion is not a professional event, and has no awards or prizes for finishing position.  Each Saturday and Sunday afternoon race has a Rolex Award winner voted by committee.  Two of the morning races each day honor a Bonham's Cup winner similarly chosen.  There are special Awards for best paddock display, best Ford-powered car, outstanding craftsmanship, etc.  The highest honor is the Rolex Spirit of Monterey Award, A Rolex watch and original Bill Patterson painting, presented to the entrant who best embodies the spirit of the event in his presentation and competition drive.

In magazines
The Reunion has been featured in Autoweek magazine. It was featured in an online article in early August 2008 and in the September 2008 issue. The 2003 event was featured in an issue of Popular Mechanics. Popular Mechanics also documented the 2000 event. The 2009 event was also featured.

The 2010 event was featured in an issue of Road & Track. The 2004 event was also featured in an article on the R&T website.

Telecasts

For many years television network Speed Channel provided coverage of the event. For a few years the coverage consisted of several different episodes featuring the major groups (IMSA, Trans Am, F1, and Can Am). In later years the event was abridged to one episode combining behind-the-scenes coverage with coverage of select races. The races covered were a mix of the major groups and some of the GT groups for better interest. If the featured a one-time race group, that race may be covered. The Reunion was for a while covered by Fox Sports 1, which replaced Speed in August 2013.

Internet

In recent years the Reunion has been livestreamed by Motor Trend magazine, with the coverage being shown on YouTube.

Race groups
Various race groups from multiple eras and types of automobile racing are featured at the Monterey Reunion.  The groups often contain vehicles that competed against one another during that point in history.

Combined class

Occasionally the schedule will feature combined-class races, such as the sports racing cars competing alongside the GT cars. While these two groups race simultaneously, they do not compete against each other, much like in professional racing.

Former groups
 Previously the event featured a mixed "GT and production cars" race group in which professionally raced grand tourers competed against unmodified sports cars of the same era. The unmodified cars have since been phased out.
 In the past the prewar groups were divided into two types: production (sports, racing, and touring) and single-seater (Indy roadsters and grand prix). The latter has since been merged with the racing cars. The sports and racing cars were also merged and ultimately combined with the touring cars.
United States Road Racing Championship- a former name for the sports racing cars

Special race groups
The Reunion also features special or expanded race groups in an attempt to generate greater interest from its spectators. These often one-time groups have included Grand National and Winston Cup Series stock cars, an under two liter Trans Am Series race group, and a Formula Atlantic group. Single-marque spec groups have also been featured. In 2011 an all Jaguar XKE race was featured to commemorate that model's fiftieth anniversary. The same was done in 2012 for the Shelby Cobra, featuring small block AC Cobras racing against the big block Shelby 427 Cobras. In 2013 an all Porsche 911 "Weissach Cup" was featured to commemorate the fiftieth anniversary of the 911.

Featured marques
In 1975, the event introduced the tradition of honoring a "featured marque" each year. This tribute is done through various ways. These include an increased number of entered vehicles from that marque, special displays of the marque's history and some of the brand's vehicles (past and/or present, with the former sometimes featuring entered vehicles), and sometimes spec races only featuring vehicles from the marque being tributed. Occasionally the event will have special one-time tributes. These have included Can Am team Chaparral Cars and racing legend Juan Manuel Fangio.

Rules and format
Because of the high value of many of the cars used, the Reunion committee has established a severe punishment for avoidable contact. The driver convicted will be unable to participate in any further events, but can appeal the judgement one year after the incident.

In contrast to the Goodwood Revival, the races at the Monterey Reunion tend not to feature hard competition due to the high value of the cars.

In the prewar groups the drivers can be seen waving as a signal to other drivers to pass. This is to avoid any potentially-severe or costly damage to the vehicles.

Although the event features many groups of different types of racecars, it does not strictly place entrants in their most appropriate groups. For example, a 2.1 liter Morgan can be placed in an under two liter class despite being over the specified displacement. This is done due to the over two liter groups often featuring vehicles with at least five liters (a la SCCA). Certain postwar cars have been known to compete with the prewar cars due to technological similarities (e.g. the MG T-Series). Some drivers will enter themselves in the wrong class either as a late entry or if they were unable to qualify for their more appropriate class. The Trans Am Series race group, despite being predominantly five-liter cars, occasionally features an under two liter car.

Formerly, some races were  held on Saturday and some on Sunday, with qualifying being held on Friday. For 2022 this was changed so that all groups were on Saturday.

Modern race cars
In recent years there have been multiple instances in which contemporary racecars have been included in the race groups despite having been manufactured much later than even the most contemporary racecars regularly featured. In 2009, when featuring Porsche, an American Le Mans Series Porsche 911 was entered in the IMSA GT race group. That group was chosen due to the technological similarities between the IMSA GT cars and the modern ALMS cars. In 2012, an ALMS Corvette competed with the IMSA GTO race group. The event was featuring split IMSA groups that year: IMSA GT/GTX/AAGT/GTU and IMSA GTO. The latter was chosen due to the Corvette's more powerful engine. For 2016, the event featured contemporary BMW racecars such as those used in the ALMS in commemoration of that brand's centennial. In recent years a mixed race group of ALMS and GTP cars has been featured.

Professional drivers

Although the Reunion is an amateur event and features predominantly non-professional competitors, some current and former professionals do attend. They are especially found in the IMSA groups.

Notable entrants include:
The Edelbrock family.
Randy Pobst
Boris Said
Bruce Canepa
Brian Redman
David Hobbs
Leh Keen
David Brabham
Jim Hall
Tommy Kendall
Marshall Teague

Sister events

Prior to 2010, the event was affiliated with the Wine Country Classic at Sonoma Raceway in Sonoma, California. The event is now known as the Sonoma Speed Festival. The event also featured Formula 5000 in 2008. Prior to 2010 the event was organized as a doubleheader, after which the event was redone to be more like the Monterey Event. The inaugural year of this new event had Saturday rained out, forcing all the race groups to be contested on Sunday. This became the format thereafter. The event also often features 1980s Trans Am Series cars racing alongside the IMSA GTO cars due to their technological similarities (IMSA GTO vehicles were often also used in Trans Am, similar to the Continental Tire Sports Car Challenge street tuner vehicles being able to compete in the Pirelli World Challenge touring car classes). This event also features classic NASCAR vehicles from both the Grand National and Winston Cup Series eras due to the event held there.

In May, 2017, a smaller event at WeatherTech Raceway debuted known as the Spring Classic.

Change of management

After the 2009 event, General Racing Ltd. (GRL), who created and owned the event, and the Sports Car Racing Association of Monterey Peninsula (SCRAMP) announced that GRL would no longer sanction the event and that a new event would be organized by SCRAMP that would be more economically viable. After the 2010 event, the new event would be called the Rolex Monterey Motorsports Reunion. The original name was still owned and copyrighted by GRL, who would retain the sister event at Sonoma Raceway. SCRAMP recognizes the Historics and the Reunion as two separate events.

Despite the reorganization, change of management, and SCRAMP's observance of the "new event" as separate from the original Historics, the Reunion does not feature any notable differences from the original event aside from the new name. The Reunion uses exactly the same structure as the Historics and features the same regular race groups.

Commendations

In 2013, the Reunion was nominated for the Motor Sports Event category at the International Historic Motoring Awards.

In 2017, the Rolex Monterey Motorsports Reunion won the FIA Founding Members' Heritage Cup for Motorsport Event of the Year, the first event at an American venue to receive the prestigious award.

References 

Recurring sporting events established in 1974
Sports in Monterey County, California
Historic motorsport events
Tourist attractions in Monterey County, California
Motorsport competitions in California
1974 establishments in California
Rolex sponsorships